Naragasooran is an unreleased Indian Tamil-language supernatural thriller film written and directed by Karthick Naren. Produced by Badri Kasthuri, it features an ensemble cast led by Aravind Swamy, Shriya Saran, Sundeep Kishan, Aathmika and Indrajith Sukumaran. It is the second film in Naren's "thriller trilogy", with the first one being Dhuruvangal Pathinaaru, and it also stands as a spin-off of the former. 

The film remained unreleased due to various financial constraints.

Cast 
 Arvind Swamy as Aathreya Venu
 Indrajith Sukumaran as Lakshman
 Shriya Saran as Geetha (voiceover by Savitha Reddy)
 Sundeep Kishan as Vinay
 Aathmika as Tharini (voiceover by Raveena Ravi)
 Aathma Patrick
 Kitty
 Nalinikanth

Production

Development 
In February 2017, Karthik Naren announced their second project, a spin off to his "thriller trilogy" which began with Dhuruvangal Pathinaaru. In a report from The Times of India, Naren stated that the film is an "intense suspense drama that is set against the backdrop of a mountain range". The very same day, Gautham Vasudev Menon announced their collaboration with Naren, by funding the project in his Ondraga Entertainment banner along with Badri Kasthuri.

Casting 
Initially Arvind Swami and Naga Chaitanya were reported to appear in the film as parallel leads, with the latter making his Tamil debut. but Chaitanya opted out of the project due to schedule conflicts, and Sundeep Kishan being brought on board for the project. In May 2017, Shriya Saran and Indrajith Sukumaran were reported to appear in pivotal roles. Aathmika was reported to play another female lead in the project, bagging her second film in Tamil, after her debut in Meesaya Murukku (2017). Sukumaran was reported to appear the role of a cop, while Kishen's character is reported to have negative shades.

Filming 
The film's first look poster, featuring the names of the lead cast was released on 18 June 2017. Naren eventually planned to start the shoot the film in June or July 2017. However, the film began production on 16 September 2017. Shooting was filmed extensively in and around Ooty, and was wrapped up in November 2017, within a span of 41 days.

Release 
In March 2018, sources claimed that the film will be released in May 2018. However, the financial constraints of Menon's production house, Ondraga Entertainment, resulted the delay of his other projects, had implemented disputes between Naren and Menon with both parties posted cryptic tweets in social media. Subsequently, Menon backed out producing the film, and Badri Kasthuri took care of the rights. The film was sent to the censor board officials in July 2018, where it received U/A certificate without any cuts. The film's official trailer which released in August 2018 received positive response, and Karthick Naren announced that the film will be released on 31 August 2018, after getting approval from Tamil Film Producers Council. However, the release was pushed to 13 September 2018, to coincide the occasion of Vinayagar Chathurthi, which did not happen. The makers released the first look of its dubbed Telugu version in February 2019, titled as Narakasurudu and Satyanarayana Koneru acquired the rights of the film.

During the time of delay, Naren started working on another project, which was the Arun Vijay-starrer Mafia: Chapter 1 (2020). In December 2019, Naren announced that the film will be scheduled for theatrical release on 27 March 2020, which further delayed due to the COVID-19 pandemic. The makers then explored the options of releasing the film directly through OTT platforms, as the uncertainty prevailing over the reopening of theatres due to the pandemic.  However, plans for a digital release also failed and the film remained unreleased. On 28 May 2021, it was announced that Sony LIV bought the direct digital streaming rights for the film. The release date is yet to be announced.

References

External links 
 

Fictional portrayals of the Tamil Nadu Police
Films shot in Chennai
Films shot in Coimbatore
Films shot in Ooty
Indian crime drama films
Indian nonlinear narrative films
Indian supernatural thriller films
Unreleased Tamil-language films
Films directed by Karthick Naren